Claude's syndrome is a form of brainstem stroke syndrome characterized by the presence of an ipsilateral oculomotor nerve palsy, contralateral hemiparesis, contralateral ataxia, and contralateral hemiplegia of the lower face, tongue, and shoulder.
Claude's syndrome affects oculomotor nerve, red nucleus and brachium conjunctivum.

Cause

Claude's syndrome is caused by midbrain infarction as a result of occlusion of a branch of the posterior cerebral artery.  This lesion is usually a unilateral infarction of the red nucleus and cerebellar peduncle, affecting several structures in the midbrain including:

It is very similar to Benedikt's syndrome.

Other causes
It has been reported that posterior cerebral artery stenosis can also precipitate Claude's syndrome.

Diagnosis

History
It carries the name of Henri Charles Jules Claude, a French psychiatrist and neurologist, who described the condition in 1912.

See also
 Wallenberg's syndrome
 Moritz Benedikt

References

External links 

Stroke
Syndromes affecting the nervous system